The 1893 Orange Athletic Club football team was an American football team that represented the Orange Athletic Club in the American Football Union (AFU) during the 1893 college football season. The AFU in 1893 consisted of three amateur football teams – the Orange Athletic Club, the New York Athletic Club from Manhattan, and the Crescent Athletic Club from Brooklyn. The Orange team played its home games at the Orange Oval in East Orange, New Jersey, compiled a 7–2 record (2–0 against AFU opponents), and won the AFU championship.

Schedule

References

Orange Athletic Club
Orange Athletic Club football seasons
Orange Athletic Club football